Mary Wineberg (née Danner, born January 3, 1980) is an American track and field athlete from Cincinnati, Ohio. She was born in Brooklyn, New York. After graduating from Walnut Hills High School, she attended the University of Cincinnati on a track scholarship, graduating in 2002 with a bachelor's degree in education.

Wineberg was an Olympic competitor in athletics at the 2008 Summer Olympics in Beijing. She competed in the 400m race and finished fifth in her semifinal, which did not qualify her for the final. However, Wineberg ran the first leg for the U.S. Women's 4 × 400 metres relay team that won the gold medal at the Games. She was the University of Cincinnati's first female African American athlete to win gold at an Olympic Games.

Wineberg was sponsored by Nike and later the New York Athletic Club/Brooks. She was coached by Jim Schnur, and her husband Chris Wineberg served as her training partner. She retired from the sport in 2013, after losing her mother in 2012.

Wineberg now lives in Cincinnati, Ohio, USA, and works as an educator.  She has been inducted into the University of Cincinnati Hall of Fame, the Cincinnati Public Schools Hall of Fame, has a day named after her in Cincinnati (September 21 is Mary Wineberg Day), and has received numerous awards and accolades for her performance in the Olympics and also from mentoring youth in the community. She has written two books- "Unwavering Perseverance: An Olympic Gold Medalist Finds Peace", and a children's book "I Didn't Win".  Wineberg is married and has two daughters.

References

USATF profile

External links
Official website
Profile at teamusa.org

Living people
1980 births
Sportspeople from Brooklyn
Track and field athletes from Cincinnati
Track and field athletes from New York City
American female sprinters
African-American female track and field athletes
Olympic gold medalists for the United States in track and field
Athletes (track and field) at the 2008 Summer Olympics
Medalists at the 2008 Summer Olympics
World Athletics Championships athletes for the United States
World Athletics Championships medalists
World Athletics Indoor Championships medalists
World Athletics Championships winners
Olympic female sprinters
21st-century African-American sportspeople
21st-century African-American women
20th-century African-American people
20th-century African-American women